Line S7 is a line on the Munich S-Bahn network. It is operated by DB Regio Bayern. It runs from Wolfratshausen via Höllriegelskreuth, central Munich, Höhenkirchen-Siegertsbrunn and Aying to Kreuzstraße. Trains reverse in Munich East station and, in order for S-Bahn services from St.-Martin-Straße to be inserted into the S-Bahn line while simultaneously reversing to run into the S-Bahn tunnel under central Munich or vice versa, the line between Munich East station and the flying junction between München-Giesing and Fasangarten stations is one of the few in Germany that has traffic running on the left.

The line is operated at 20-minute intervals between Höllriegelskreuth and Höhenkirchen-Siegertsbrunn. Two out of three trains an hour continue from Höllriegelskreuth to Wolfratshausen and from Höhenkirchen-Siegertsbrunn to Aying, so that the gap between trains alternates between 20 and 40 minutes. Only one train an hour continues from Aying to Kreuzstraße. It is operated using class 423 four-car electrical multiple units, usually as two coupled sets. In the evenings and on Sundays they generally run as single sets.

The line runs over lines built at various times:
 from Wolfratshausen to a point to the north of Grosshesselohe Isartal station on the Isar Valley Railway, opened by the Lokalbahn AG company (LAG) on 27 July 1891 and electrified from Wolfratshausen to Höllriegelskreuth in May 1960 and from Höllriegelskreuth to Grosshesselohe Isartal at 580 volts DC and converted to 15 kV AC on 27 September 1957
from a point to the north of Grosshesselohe Isartal station to a point southwest of München Donnersbergerbrücke station on the Munich–Holzkirchen railway opened on 24 June 1854 as part of the Bavarian Maximilian's Railway and electrified on 27 September 1957
the Southern lines tunnel (Südstreckentunnel) to Donnersbergerbrücke station, opened on 31 May 1981
from Donnersbergerbrücke to the beginning of the S-Bahn trunk line over tracks running parallel to the Munich–Augsburg railway, opened by the Munich–Augsburg Railway Company on 1 September 1839
the S-Bahn trunk line from the approaches to Munich Central Station (Hauptbahnhof) to Munich East station, opened on 1 May 1971
from Munich East station to München Frankenwaldstr. junction, south of München-Giesing station, on the Munich East–Deisenhofen railway, opened by the Royal Bavarian State Railways on 10 October 1898 and electrified in March 1971.
from München Frankenwaldstr. junction to Kreuzstraße over the Munich-Giesing–Kreuzstraße railway, opened by the Royal Bavarian State Railways on 5 June 1904 and electrified in March 1971.

S-Bahn services commenced on 28 May 1972 as S-Bahn line 10 between Wolfratshausen and service from Wolfratshausen to Holzkirchen wing station (Holzkirchner Flügelbahnhof) of Munich Hauptbahnhof as they could not yet continue through the S-Bahn trunk line tunnel because the so-called southern lines tunnel (Südstreckentunnel), which passes under the long-distance tracks towards Pasing and the S-Bahn trunk line, was not yet available. With the opening of the southern lines tunnel on the S-Bahn route on 31 May 1981, the S-Bahn line from Wolfratshausen continued on the S-Bahn trunk line; as a result it was renamed as line  (as single digit numbers were reserved for lines that ran through the trunk line tunnel).

Notes

Munich S-Bahn lines
1972 establishments in Germany